Henry Marc Brunel (27 June 1842 – 7 October 1903) was an English civil engineer and the son of the celebrated engineer Isambard Kingdom Brunel and grandson of civil engineer Marc Isambard Brunel.

Henry Marc Brunel was born in Westminster, London on 27 June 1842, the second son of the celebrated engineer Isambard Kingdom Brunel and Elizabeth Mary Horsley. He decided to follow his father and grandfather's footsteps by becoming a civil engineer. Brunel attended King's College London from 1859–1861, and then gained experience in civil engineering through serving out various apprenticeships. He helped take down his father's Hungerford Bridge with Sir John Hawkshaw so the chains are now at Clifton Suspension Bridge. He conducted initial surveys for a Channel Tunnel. He developed an interest in acting as a hobby, becoming a member of the Scientific and Amateur Dramatic Societies, and also contributed to his brother's biography of their father.

Henry is noted for a partnership from 1878 with Sir John Wolfe Barry, with whom he designed the Blackfriars Railway Bridge and (after Sir Horace Jones died) Tower Bridge over the River Thames in central London. Their other works included the docks at Barry in south Wales and the Creagan Bridge, a railway bridge over the narrows of Loch Creran in Scotland (jointly credited to Wolfe Barry, Brunel and E.M. Crutwell). Sir Alexander Gibb was a pupil of Brunel and Wolfe Barry in 1895.

He also designed the SS Chauncy Maples, which was built in Glasgow in 1899 and transported overland to Lake Nyasa in Africa, where it served for more than one hundred years as a mission and hospital clinic.

Brunel is buried with his father, grandfather, and other family members at Kensal Green Cemetery in London.

References

English civil engineers
British bridge engineers
1842 births
1903 deaths
Presidents of the Smeatonian Society of Civil Engineers
Alumni of King's College London
Burials at Kensal Green Cemetery
English people of French descent
19th-century British engineers
Family of Isambard Kingdom Brunel
William Horsley family